Innocent Asonze (born December 13, 1972) is a former sprinter from Nigeria. Together with Francis Obikwelu, Daniel Effiong and Deji Aliu he won a bronze medal in 4 x 100 metres relay at the 1999 World Championships in Athletics, but the team was later disqualified (in August 2005) because he failed a doping test in June 1999.

Personal bests 
 100 metres - 10.04 (1997)
 200 metres - 20.88 (1991)

See also 
 List of sportspeople sanctioned for doping offences

References

External links
 

1972 births
Living people
Nigerian male sprinters
African Games gold medalists for Nigeria
African Games medalists in athletics (track and field)
Athletes (track and field) at the 1999 All-Africa Games
World Athletics Championships athletes for Nigeria
Athletes stripped of World Athletics Championships medals
Doping cases in athletics
Nigerian sportspeople in doping cases